The Moon River is a gin-based cocktail.

Characteristics
Ingredients and measures: 4-5 ice cubes; 1/2 measure dry gin; 1/2 measures apricot brandy; 1/2 measure Cointreau; 1/4 measure Galliano; 1/4 measure fresh lemon juice; cocktail cherry for decoration.

Preparation 
Put some ice cubes into a mixing glass. Pour the gin, apricot brandy, Cointreau, Galliano, and lemon juice over the ice, stir, then strain into a large, chilled cocktail glass. Decorate with a cocktail cherry.

See also 
Bronx (cocktail)
Lemon Drop – a similar cocktail prepared with vodka
List of cocktails
Gibson (cocktail)
Vesper (cocktail)

External links 
 

Cocktails with gin